The Rural Municipality of Corman Park No. 344 is a rural municipality (RM) in the Canadian province of Saskatchewan within Census Division No. 11 and  Division No. 5. Located in the central portion of the province, the RM surrounds the City of Saskatoon.

History 
The RM of Corman Park No. 344 was formed by the amalgamation of three rural municipalities – the RMs of Cory No. 344, Warman No. 374 and Park No. 375. The three RMs were disorganized on December 31, 1969 to enable the incorporation of the RM of Corman Park No. 344 on January 1, 1970.

Heritage properties
Two designated historical properties are located in the RM.
 Opimihaw (now referred to as Wanuskewin Heritage Park) is a 58 hectare property with 14 precontact archaeological sites in the Opimihaw Creek valley.
 Bone Trail in the 1800s buffalo bones were collected on the prairie, and transported along this trail to Saskatoon for transfer onto rail cars so that they could be sent to eastern Canada where they were crushed into fertilizer.

Geography 
The South Saskatchewan River flows from the southwest corner to the northeast corner of the RM while the North Saskatchewan River forms the RM's northwest boundary. The RM works closely with the Meewasin Valley Authority to protect the South Saskatchewan River valley.

Communities and localities 
The following urban municipalities are surrounded by the RM.

Cities
Martensville
Saskatoon
Warman

Towns
Dalmeny
Langham
Osler

The following unincorporated communities are within the RM.

Organized hamlets
 Beaver Creek
 Casa Rio
 Cathedral Bluffs
 Cedar Villa Estates
 Discovery Ridge
 Eagle Ridge Country Estates
 Furdale
 Merrill Hills
 Neuhorst
 River's Edge
 Riverside Estates

Localities
 Bergheim
 Blumenheim
 Cory
 Floral
 Grasswood
 Haultain
 Rheinland
 South Corman Park

Demographics 

The RM's German Canadian population is much higher proportionately than the national or provincial averages: 43.4% (3,645 persons).

Government 
The RM of Corman Park No. 344 is governed by an elected municipal council and an appointed administrator that meets on the second and third Monday of every month. The reeve of the RM is Judy Harwood while its Chief Administrative Officer is Ken Kolb. The RM's office is located in Saskatoon. As of October 2018 the reeve is Judy Harwood, and the eight councillors are:
 Division 1: John Germs
 Division 2: Michelle Chuhaniuk
 Division 3: Lyndon Haduik
 Division 4: David Greenwood
 Division 5: Arthur Pruim
 Division 6: Bas Froese-Kooijenga;

 Division 7: Calvin Vaandrager
 Division 8: Wendy Trask

A majority of voters in a November 2011 plebiscite favoured the council be changed from 11 to 8 councillors, a move that was controversial. The elected councillors of the day requested that the provincial government not take action on the plebiscite. However, the request was ignored and the municipal boundaries were redrawn with 8 divisions. A new council was elected on February 29, 2012, with four incumbents and four new councillors.

Emergency response 
The RM of Corman Park No. 344 contracts with the City of Saskatoon and the other municipalities for the provision of fire protection.

The RM operates a police service of 10 officers who work in partnership with the Royal Canadian Mounted Police (RCMP). Corman Park Police Service actively partners with all other law enforcement agencies in the Saskatoon and district police universe including the Saskatoon Police Service and Dalmeny Police Service.

The Corman Park Police Service acts in partnership with the RCMP under the terms of Order in Council (OIC) 109/2001 as amended by OIC 92/2006. The service operates out of the municipal office in Saskatoon.

Attractions 
In the RM of Corman Park, along the southern banks of the North Saskatchewan River, near the Highway 16 bridge, is Borden Bridge Recreation Site. The 15-hectare park has a campground and picnic area as well as access to the North Saskatchewan River and the abandoned Borden Bridge.

The RM of Corman Park is home to a Super Dual Auroral Radar Network radar site operated by the University of Saskatchewan.

Cranberry Flats Conservation Area 
The park is a "sand-based conservation area" with sandy beaches, self-guided nature trails, and a lookout. Access is from Highway 219. Adjacent to Cranberry Flats, in the middle of the river, is a protected area called Wilson Island. These sites are also operated by the Meewasin Valley Authority.

Transportation 
Rail
 Colonsay Branch C.P.R—serves Saskatoon, Colonsay, Forslund, Zangwill, Young and Plassey.
 Minnedosa–Saskatoon–Edmonton Section C.P.R—serves Colonsay, Elstow, Blucher, Cheviot, Floral, Sutherland, Saskatoon, Cory, Dunfermline, Asquith, Rhyl, Kinley, Perdue Keppel, Vance and Biggar.
 Carlton Branch, C.N.R—serves Saskatoon, Warman, Dalmeny
 Delisle Elrose Branch C.N.R—serves Saskatoon, Delisle, Birdview, Swanson and Ardath.
 Regina Branch, C.N.R—serves Kenaston, Strong, Hanley, Indi, Dundurn, Strehlow, Haultain, Grasswood, Nutana, Saskatoon, Clarks Crossing, Warmsn and Osler.
 Winnipeg, Edmonton, Prince Rupert Division, C.N.R—serves Winnipeg, Saskatoon, Edmonton and Jasper.

Air
 Saskatoon/Banga International Air Aerodrome (id: CJN5; aka "Corman Park Airport") formerly Saskatoon/Corman Air Park

See also 
 List of rural municipalities in Saskatchewan

References

External links 

C

Division No. 11, Saskatchewan